Peronaemis is a genus of beetles in the family Buprestidae, containing the following species:

 Peronaemis cupricollis Fisher, 1949
 Peronaemis elegans Fisher, 1930
 Peronaemis insulicolis Fisher, 1940
 Peronaemis monticolus Fisher, 1936
 Peronaemis thoracicus Waterhouse, 1887
 Peronaemis viridimaculatus (Fisher, 1925)
 Peronaemis viridithorax Zayas, 1988

References

Buprestidae genera